Kavkazsky District is an administrative district (raion), one of the thirty-eight in Krasnodar Krai, Russia. As a municipal division, it is incorporated as Kavkazsky Municipal District. It is located in the east of the krai. Its administrative center is the rural locality (a stanitsa) of Kavkazskaya. Population:  The population of Kavkazskaya accounts for 25.1% of the district's total population.

History
The district was established on June 2, 1924 as Kropotkinsky District, with the administrative center in the stanitsa of Kavkazskaya. It was given its present name on January 22, 1944. In 1956, the administrative center of the district was transferred to the town of Kropotkin. On February 1, 1963, the district was transformed into a rural district with the administrative center in the town of Gulkevichi. On January 12, 1965, this transformation was reverted. On October 20, 1980, the stanitsa of Kavkazskaya became the administrative center again.

Administrative and municipal status
Within the framework of administrative divisions, the town of Kropotkin is not a part of the district and is incorporated separately. As a municipal division, however, Kropotkin is incorporated within Kavkazsky Municipal District as Kropotkinskoye Urban Settlement and serves as the municipal district's administrative center.

References

Notes

Sources

Districts of Krasnodar Krai
States and territories established in 1924